Colonel Sir Henry Yule  (1 May 1820 – 30 December 1889) was a Scottish Orientalist and geographer. He published many travel books, including translations of the work of Marco Polo and Mirabilia by the 14th-century Dominican Friar Jordanus. He was also the compiler of a dictionary of Anglo-Indian terms, the Hobson-Jobson, with Arthur Coke Burnell.

Early life
Henry Yule was born at Inveresk near Edinburgh in Scotland on 1 May 1820. He was the youngest son of Major William Yule (1764–1839) and his wife Elizabeth Paterson (died circa 1827). William Yule had served as an officer in the Bengal army of the East India Company and had retired in 1806. William's uncle was the botanist John Yule FRSE.

Elizabeth died before Henry was eight and William moved to Edinburgh with his sons, where Henry attended the Royal High School. In 1833 he was sent to be coached by the Reverend Henry Hamilton at his rectory in the village of Wath near Ripon in North Yorkshire. When Hamilton moved to Cambridge in the following year Yule was transferred to the care of the Reverend James Challis, at Papworth Everard near Cambridge. The other resident pupils were John Neale and Harvey Goodwin. (Neale co-founded the Society of Saint Margaret, an order of women in the Church of England dedicated to nursing the sick, while Goodwin became Bishop of Carlisle.) Yule's stay at Papworth Everard ended in 1826 when Challis was appointed Plumian Professor of Astronomy and moved to the Observatory in Cambridge.

After a brief period at University College London, Yule entered the East India Military College at Addiscombe near Croydon (1837–8), followed by the Royal Engineers Establishment at Chatham, Kent. He obtained his commission in December 1838, and joined the Bengal Engineers in 1840.

Both of Henry's brothers worked in India. The eldest, George Udny Yule (1813–1886), worked in the Bengal civil service. The other brother, Robert (1817–1857), died near Delhi during the Indian Rebellion. The statistician Udny Yule was the son of George and thus the nephew of Henry.

Henry was interested in Arabic and Persian literature and collected early manuscripts. These were later donated by his sons to the British Museum. He translated the Apothegms of Ali the son of Abu Talib (referring to Ali, the successor to Mohammed, the prophet of Islam; the obscure English word "apothegm" refers to short pithy sayings, see hadith.)

India

Yule arrived in Calcutta at the end of 1840. His first posting was in the Khasi Hills, a remote area to the northeast of Bengal in the modern state of Meghalaya. His mission was to establish a practical method of transporting coal to the plains. In this he was unsuccessful but he became fascinated by the region and wrote an account of its people, including the first written description of their living root bridges. In 1842 he was transferred to a team of engineers led by Captain (later General) William Baker charged with the construction of irrigation canals. Their headquarters were at Karnal,  to the north of Delhi.

He returned to England in 1843 and married his cousin Anna Maria (died 1875), daughter of Major-General Martin White of the Bengal Infantry (died 1856). In November 1843 she accompanied him back to India but returned owing to ill health. He was appointed to a committee charged with investigating the relationship between irrigation by the proposed Ganges Canal and its impact on public health in the area. He served in both the Sikh wars (1845–1846 and 1848–1849). In 1849 he took three years of extended leave and returned to live in Edinburgh with his wife. He lectured at the Scottish Naval and Military Academy and wrote a volume on fortifications (1851).

A daughter, Amy, was born in 1852 and shortly after her birth, Yule returned to Bengal. He worked in Arakan and Burma and was put in charge of a new railway system. This was interrupted by a posting as a secretary to Colonel Arthur Phayre's mission to Ava, Burma, in 1855. In 1858 he published his account of this journey, Narrative of the Mission to the Court of Ava with illustrations. The 1857 rebellion made his life difficult, and although Yule was close to the governor generals Lord Dalhousie and Lord Canning, he lost interest in his work.

Retirement in Europe
Yule retired in 1862, and Canning's death in that year made it difficult for him to find any official appointment in London. In 1863 he was created a Companion of the Order of the Bath through the influence of Sir Roderick Murchison. He devoted his leisure to the medieval history and geography of Central Asia. His wife became unwell, and they crossed Europe to settle in Palermo, Sicily. He made use of the richly stocked public libraries there during this period. He published Cathay and the Way Thither (1866), and the Book of Marco Polo (1871), for which he received the Founder's Medal of the Royal Geographical Society the following year. After his wife's death in 1875, Yule returned to England, where he was appointed to the Council of India. Yule remarried in 1877, his new wife Mary Wilhelmina (died 26 April 1881) the daughter of a Bengal civil servant, Fulwar Skipwith.

Yule was a member, and from 1877 to 1889 President, of the Hakluyt Society. He was also vice-president of the Royal Geographical Society (1887–9), and would have become a president but for a protest that he led along with Henry Hyndman against Henry Morton Stanley. The Society wanted to welcome Stanley but Yule stood against the violent methods used in Africa. One of his heroes, on the other hand, was Garnet Wolseley, 1st Viscount Wolseley.

For the Hakluyt Society, Yule edited the Mirabilia Descripta (1863), a translation of the travels of the 14th century Friar Jordanus, and The Diary of William Hedges (3 vols, 1887–89). The latter contains a biography of Governor Pitt, grandfather of William Pitt, 1st Earl of Chatham. He contributed introductions to Nikolay Przhevalsky's Mongolia (1876) and Captain William Gill's The River of Golden Sand (1880). He wrote biographical notes for the Royal Engineers' Journal, and many geographical entries in the Encyclopædia Britannica.

Yule's most popular work, compiled with Arthur C. Burnell, was the Hobson-Jobson (1886), a historical dictionary of Anglo-Indian words and phrases which continues to provide an insight into the language used in British India.

Yule died at his home at 3 Penywern Road, Earls Court, London, on 30 December 1889 aged 69, and is buried at Tunbridge Wells.

Awards
Yule was awarded an honorary doctorate (LL.D.) from Edinburgh University in 1884 and served as royal commissioner for the Colonial and Indian Exhibition of 1886. He was created Knight Commander of the Order of the Star of India in 1889. In 1889 he was made a Fellow of the Royal Scottish Geographical Society (FRSGS).

Selected publications
For a full list see Cordier & Yule (1903).

 
 Scans from Google: Volume 1, Volume 2. Scans from the Digital Silk Road Project: Volume 1, Volume 2
 Volume 1, Volume 2.
  Volume 1; Volume 2; Volume 3 William Hedges was an administrator of the East India Company
 (Searchable database)

Editions revised by Henri Cordier

 Volume 1; Volume 2. Scans from the Digital Silk Road Project: Volume 1 Volume 2.
 Volume 1; Volume 2; Volume 3; Volume 4.

Contributions

 Volume 1, Volume 2. The travels of Nikolay Przhevalsky.

References

Sources

Further reading

External links

 
 
 
 
 
 

1820 births
1889 deaths
Graduates of Addiscombe Military Seminary
Alumni of University College London
Bengal Engineers officers
British lexicographers
British military personnel of the First Anglo-Sikh War
British military personnel of the Second Anglo-Sikh War
Fellows of the Royal Scottish Geographical Society
Indologists
Knights Commander of the Order of the Star of India
Members of the Council of India
People from Musselburgh
Scottish orientalists
Recipients of the Royal Geographical Society Founder's Medal
19th-century lexicographers